In mathematics, an ordered basis of a vector space of finite dimension  allows representing uniquely any element of the vector space by a coordinate vector, which is a sequence of  scalars called coordinates. If two different bases are considered, the coordinate vector that represents a vector  on one basis is, in general, different from the coordinate vector that represents  on the other basis. A change of basis consists of converting every assertion expressed in terms of coordinates relative to one basis into an assertion expressed in terms of coordinates relative to the other basis.

Such a conversion results from the change-of-basis formula which expresses the coordinates relative to one basis in terms of coordinates relative to the other basis. Using matrices, this formula can be written

This article deals mainly with finite-dimensional vector spaces.  However, many of the principles are also valid for infinite-dimensional vector spaces.

Change of basis formula
Let  be a basis of a finite-dimensional vector space  over a field .

For , one can define a vector  by its coordinates  over 

Let

Setting  one has that  is a basis of  if and only if the matrix  is invertible, or equivalently if it has a nonzero determinant. In this case,  is said to be the change-of-basis matrix from the basis  to the basis 

The change-of-basis formula expresses the coordinates over the old basis in term of the coordinates over the new basis. With above notation, it is

In terms of matrices, the change of basis formula is

Proof: Using the above definition of the change-of basis matrix, one has

As  the change-of-basis formula results from the uniqueness of the decomposition of a vector over a basis.

Example 

So, the change-of-basis matrix is

The change-of-basis formula asserts that, if  are the new coordinates of a vector  then one has

That is, 

This may be verified by writing

In terms of linear maps
Normally, a matrix represents a linear map, and the product of a matrix and a column vector represents the function application of the corresponding linear map to the vector whose coordinates form the column vector. The change-of-basis formula is a specific case of this general principle, although this is not immediately clear from its definition and proof.

When only one basis is considered for each vector space, it is worth to leave this isomorphism implicit, and to work up to an isomorphism. As several bases of the same vector space are considered here, a more accurate wording is required.

Let  be a field, the set  of the -tuples is a -vector space whose addition and scalar multiplication are defined component-wise.

A basis  of a -vector space  defines a linear isomorphism  by 

Let  be the "old basis" of a change of basis, and  the associated isomorphism. Given a change-of basis matrix , let consider it as the matrix of an endomorphism  of  Finally, let define
 
(where  denotes function composition), and

It follows that, for  one has 

which is the change-of-basis formula expressed in terms of linear maps instead of coordinates.

Function defined on a vector space

A function that has a vector space as its domain is commonly specified as a multivariate function whose variables are the coordinates on some basis of the vector on which the function is applied.

When the basis is changed, the expression of the function is changed. This change can be computed by substituting the "old" coordinates for their expressions in terms of the "new" coordinates. More precisely, if  is the expression of the function in terms of the old coordinates, and if  is the change-of-base formula, then  is the expression of the same function in terms of the new coordinates.

The fact that the change-of-basis formula expresses the old coordinates in terms of the new one may seem unnatural, but appears as useful, as no matrix inversion is needed here.

As the change-of-basis formula involves only linear functions, many function properties are kept by a change of basis. This allows defining these properties as properties of functions of a variable vector that are not related to any specific basis. So, a function whose domain is a vector space or a subset of it is 
 a linear function,
 a polynomial function,
 a continuous function,
 a differentiable function,
 a smooth function,
 an analytic function,
if the multivariate function that represents it on some basis—and thus on every basis—has the same property.

This is specially useful in the theory of manifolds, as this allows extending the concepts of continuous, differentiable, smooth and analytic functions to functions that are defined on a manifold.

Linear maps 
Consider a linear map  from a vector space  of dimension  to a vector space  of dimension .

This is a straightforward consequence of the change-of-basis formula.

Endomorphisms 
Endomorphisms, are linear maps from a vector space  to itself. For a change of basis, the formula of the preceding section applies, with the same change-of-basis matrix on both sides of the formula.

As every invertible matrix can be used as a change-of-basis matrix, this implies that two matrices are similar if and only if they represent the same endomorphism on two different bases.

Bilinear forms 
A bilinear form on a vector space V over a field  is a function  which is linear in both arguments. That is,  is bilinear if the maps

and 
are linear for every fixed 

where  denotes the transpose of the matrix .

If  is a change of basis matrix, then a straightforward computation shows that the matrix of the bilinear form on the new basis is

This implies that the property of being a symmetric matrix must be kept by the above change-of-base formula. One can also check this by noting that the transpose of a matrix product is the product of the transposes computed in the reverse order. In particular,

and the two members of this equation equal  if the matrix  is symmetric.

If the characteristic of the ground field  is not two, then for every symmetric bilinear form there is a basis for which the matrix is diagonal. Moreover, the resulting nonzero entries on the diagonal are defined up to the multiplication by a square.

Symmetric bilinear forms over the reals are often encountered in geometry and physics, typically in the study of quadrics and of the inertia of a rigid body. In these cases, orthonormal bases are specially useful; this means that one generally prefer to restrict changes of basis to those that have an orthogonal change-of-base matrix, that is, a matrix such that  Such matrices have the fundamental property that the change-of-base formula is the same for a symmetric bilinear form and the endomorphism that is represented by the same symmetric matrix. Spectral theorem asserts that, given such a symmetric matrix, there is an orthogonal change of basis such that the resulting matrix (of both the bilinear form and the endomorphism) is a diagonal matrix with the eigenvalues of the initial matrix on the diagonal. It follows that, over the reals, if the matrix of an endomorphism is symmetric, then it is diagonalizable.

See also 
 Active and passive transformation
 Covariance and contravariance of vectors
 Integral transform, the continuous analogue of change of basis.

Notes

References

Bibliography

External links
 MIT Linear Algebra Lecture on Change of Basis, from MIT OpenCourseWare
Khan Academy Lecture on Change of Basis, from Khan Academy

Linear algebra
Matrix theory